Christopher Garcia (born January 13, 2003) is an American professional soccer player who plays as a winger for USL Championship club El Paso Locomotive.

Career
Garcia grew up in El Paso, Texas before moving to Utah where he joined the Real Salt Lake academy in 2018. He scored 18 goals in 38 appearances for the USSDA side.

On February 10, 2020, Garcia signed with the Real Salt Lake first team on a homegrown player contract. Garcia made his professional debut on September 19, 2020, appearing as an injury-time substitute during a 2–1 loss to Vancouver Whitecaps FC.

On August 10, 2021, Garcia was loaned to Swedish side Ljungskile SK for the remainder of the 2021 season.

Garcia was loaned to USL Championship club El Paso Locomotive on September 1, 2022.

Following his release from Salt Lake at the end of the 2022 season, Garcia joined El Paso Locomotive on a permanent basis on January 5, 2023.

Personal life
Born in the United States, Garcia is of Mexican descent.

References

External links

2003 births
Living people
American soccer players
American sportspeople of Mexican descent
Association football forwards
Homegrown Players (MLS)
Major League Soccer players
Real Salt Lake players
Soccer players from El Paso, Texas
Ljungskile SK players
Real Monarchs players
USL Championship players
MLS Next Pro players
El Paso Locomotive FC players